The Up and Coming Tour was a concert tour by Paul McCartney. The tour began on 28 March 2010, at the Jobing.com Arena in Glendale, Arizona, northwest of Downtown Phoenix. As with McCartney's other concert tours as a solo artist, the setlist for the Up and Coming Tour was composed of songs by his former bands the Beatles and Wings, as well as songs from his solo career. The tour included two concerts at the Hollywood Bowl in Los Angeles, followed by concerts in Miami and San Juan, the latter marking both McCartney's first concert in Puerto Rico and the first visit by a member of the Beatles. The tour ended on 10 June 2011 with a show in Las Vegas, Nevada.

The Up and Coming Tour was performed across venues in North America, Europe, and South America. Tickets for the concert in Buenos Aires, Argentina, were sold out within an hour, and a second concert in the same venue was announced for the following day due to the demand. During the tour, McCartney received the Library of Congress' Gershwin Prize for Popular Song from President Barack Obama.

Background
McCartney announced shows for Europe, including his first appearance at the Isle of Wight Festival, his first Scottish date for 20 years at Hampden Park, Glasgow, his last being at Glasgow SECC Arena on 23 June 1990 and his first show in Cardiff, Wales in over three decades, at the Millennium Stadium. Additional dates are to be announced. On 5 April McCartney announced his first concert in Mexico since 2002. On 17 May McCartney announced a return to the United States in July, visiting Salt Lake City and San Francisco. On 28 May 2010, McCartney announced his first-ever show in Nashville. The Salt Lake City show marked McCartney's first show in Utah, and the San Francisco show marked his first performance in the city since The Beatles performed at Candlestick Park in 1966. On 3 June 2010, McCartney announced he would be opening the Consol Energy Center in Pittsburgh with a show on 18 August 2010. He also announced other cities, including Denver, Kansas City, Toronto, Montreal and Philadelphia as part of the tour's upcoming return to North America. On 7 June 2010, McCartney announced his first show in Charlotte, North Carolina since his mammoth New World Tour in 1993. It was McCartney's first show in North Carolina since his Back in the U.S. Tour in 2002. On 14 June 2010, McCartney announced second dates for Toronto and Pittsburgh, due to popular demand in both cities, and the fact that the shows sold out in minutes. McCartney's 14 August 2010 show at the Wachovia Center sold out in two minutes, and another show was added for 15 August. In November 2010, McCartney returned to Argentina and Brazil for the first time in 17 years since the New World Tour with two sold out shows in São Paulo that attracted over 140,000 fans. McCartney returned to South America in 2011 for another 4 concerts, Peru, Chile and two in Rio de Janeiro, Brazil. The tour ended on 10 June with a show in Las Vegas.

The O2 rehearsals 
Three months after ending his Good Evening Europe Tour at The O2, McCartney used the arena to stage full rehearsals.  He had previously hired the venue to rehearse for his '04 Summer Tour.

Talking about performing in London, McCartney said, "My last show of 2009 was in London at The O2 and we had a great night, there was a great party atmosphere. I hope that this summer we can have an even bigger party in Hyde Park. I've had a little taste of performing in the park when I guested briefly with Neil Young there last summer and it tasted good. So I'm looking forward to getting there with the band and performing our own show."

Technical specifications 
The tour required 31 trucks to transport all its equipment and employed a full-time crew of over 150 people to make it all work. The indoor concerts on the tour used 90 speakers, and the outdoor stadium shows used 130. Backstage at each show there were 14 touring offices and dressing rooms. The catering department served approximately 480 vegetarian meals a day to the crew.

Web chat
Paul McCartney made his second webchat with fans on 20 May 2010 (his first being in 1997, setting a World Record). He spoke from his Sussex studio during the chat. He announced the winners of a competition run by his website, and said that the tour would most likely visit Brazil, Peru, Chile, and Argentina. He also praised his confidence with his band members during the tour.

Gershwin Prize

McCartney received the Library of Congress' Gershwin Prize for Popular Song from President Barack Obama on 2 June 2010. McCartney is the third winner of the Gershwin prize, which is the most prestigious American award for popular music.

After collecting the award, McCartney performed at a star-studded concert inside the White House, playing songs such as "Eleanor Rigby", "Let It Be" and "Michelle" in tribute to the US First Lady, Michelle Obama. Stevie Wonder joined him on stage to perform a duet of "Ebony and Ivory" before McCartney ended the concert with "Hey Jude".

Also performing were Faith Hill, Emmylou Harris, Jack White, Dave Grohl, Lang Lang, Jonas Brothers, Herbie Hancock, Corinne Bailey Rae and Elvis Costello.

Reception

In the United States 
Reception towards the Up and Coming Tour in the United States was generally positive.

In Phoenix: The Arizona Republic stated the following: "With apologies to Ringo Starr, The Beatles legacy couldn’t have hoped to be in better hands at this late date than Paul McCartney's."

In Los Angeles, McCartney said, "The first time we came here we were little kids", told the sold-out Bowl throng, recalling how big it seemed."

In Miami: "There was a little of everything: Good potential for a contact high. Beatles Rock Band images on the big video screen. AARP members storming the barricades just like in the '60s – only with digital cameras, not protest signs. A ukulele-powered version of "Something".

In South America 

In Buenos Aires, the online presale began on 10 October by CrowdSurge, two days later by Ticketek (only for BBVA Banco Francés customers). The presale began at 10 am, but 4 minutes later the system crashed. The 25,000 tickets enabled for the Ticketek presale sold out within hours, along with the general public sale. On 14 October ticketek announced a new concert for Thursday 11 November; this show was added due to overwhelming demand. The pre-sale (again only for BBVA Banco Francé customers) began 15 and the regular tickets on 19. Both concerts sold out in a few hours. The first concert sold out in 1 hour, and the second one in nine hours.

Rede Globo, Brazil's television network, broadcast one hour of "best moments" of the first São Paulo concert on 21 November. Both São Paulo tickets were sold out in less than 10 hours, with over 128,000 sold.

Tour band

Tour dates

Festivals and other miscellaneous performances

Setlist

Instruments played by band members

See also
 List of Paul McCartney concert tours

References

2010 concert tours
2011 concert tours
Paul McCartney concert tours